Yellow Belly Lake is an alpine lake in Custer County, Idaho, United States, located in the Sawtooth Valley in the Sawtooth National Recreation Area. Yellow Belly Lake can be accessed from State Highway 75 via Sawtooth National Forest road 205 and 096. Forest road 096 is a high clearance road that goes directly to a trailhead and campground on the shores of Yellow Belly Lake.

In the southern section of the Sawtooth Valley, Yellow Belly Lake is one of the largest lakes in Sawtooth National Recreation Area.

References

See also
 List of lakes of the Sawtooth Mountains (Idaho)
 Sawtooth National Forest
 Sawtooth National Recreation Area
 Sawtooth Range (Idaho)

Lakes of Idaho
Lakes of Custer County, Idaho
Glacial lakes of the United States